Mia Martina is the self-titled second studio album by Canadian singer Mia Martina. It was released on October 14, 2014 in Russia and as a special Deluxe Edition in Japan on December 10, 2014. Martina sought to make this album more personal than her debut album Devotion, drawing influence from her personal life, friends and trips around the world.

Background
Whereas Martina's debut album achieved moderate success, it spawned three very successful singles: the remix of “Stereo Love” was certified Platinum (over 80,000 units sold), while “Latin Moon” and “Burning” were certified Gold (over 40,000 units sold) by Music Canada. Martina has described her debut album as a dream come true, but wanted to explore a different sound in the second album.

Development and recording
Recording sessions took place in Toronto, Miami, Los Angeles and Moscow. Martina stated in multiple interviews the album is more personal, she had more creative control and co-wrote all but one song in the record.

Singles
In February 2013 “Heartbreaker” was released as the first single from the album. Martina teamed up with Canadian musicians RyanDan and Brad Lamborghini to revitalize her sound. RyanDan and Martina worked together before, the duo being responsible for previous singles “Latin Moon” and “Missing You”. A music video directed by Russel Majik premiered on MSN.ca Entertainment and a francophone rendition (version française) was released a few months later. “Heartbreaker” peaked at number 44 on the Canadian Hot 100, and was nominated for Dance Recording of the Year at the 2014 Juno Awards. “La La...” followed up as a second single in June 2013 and was re-recorded in French as well. "La La..." did not make in to the final track list, but was included in the Russian edition and Japanese edition of the album.

In the summer of 2013 a remix of “Tu me manques” reached number 2 on the Russian Top 100 charts. Although “Tu me manques” alongside its English version “Missing You” were released as singles from her debut album, the success of the song in the Commonwealth of Independent States prompted its inclusion in the Russian edition of the album. Meanwhile, “Cabo” was released promotionally on YouTube in August 2013, but was not included in the record. It is a song about Cabo San Lucas and was co-written by Jenson Vaughan, Chris Fabich and Tobias Zwiefler.

Martina collaborated with American singer Dev in the third single "Danse", released in November 2013. A music video inspired by Studio 54 soon followed. It became a Top 40 success, peaking at number 29 on the Canadian Hot 100 and was certified Gold.

In September 2014 “HFH” (standing for “Heart Fucking Hurts”) was released as the fourth single from the album. A clean version of the song with the line "my heart fucking hurts" replaced with "my heart really hurts" was sent to radios in Canada. On September 16, 2014 "Beast (feat. Waka Flocka)" was released as a countdown single on iTunes.

Release
Mia Martina was released on October 14, 2014 in Russia by First Music Publishing. Its Canadian release was planned for the same day, but it was pushed back. Martina stated there will be "little changes for the better" in the album. A Deluxe Edition of the album was released in Japan on November 19, 2014. The Japanese Edition includes the buzz single "La La...". Mia Martina was finally released in Canada as an EP on April 7, 2015.

Track listing

Release history

References

2014 albums
Mia Martina albums